Vaccinium erythrocarpum – also commonly known as mountain blueberry, southern mountain cranberry, bearberry, arando, and dingleberry – is a species of cranberry.

Vaccinium erythrocarpum has an oddly discontinuous distribution, with one subspecies in the southeastern United States and the other in east Asia.

Vaccinium erythrocarpum is a deciduous shrub. Its flowers bloom in June; the individual flowers are hermaphrodite and are pollinated by insects. They produce scarlet, transparent berries. It grows in woodlands and areas of dappled shade.

Subspecies
Vaccinium erythrocarpum subsp. erythrocarpum (Miq.) Kloet – southern Appalachian Mountains of southeastern United States (from West Virginia to northeastern Georgia)
Vaccinium erythrocarpum subsp. japonicum – China, Japan, Korea

References

External links
 Plants For A Future database: Vaccinium erythrocarpum

erythrocarpum
Flora of the Southeastern United States
Plants described in 1803
Flora of Eastern Asia
Flora of China
erythrocarpum
Flora without expected TNC conservation status